Paroha is a village in Nalanda district in the Indian state of Bihar.

Demographics
As of 2011 India census, Paroha had a population of 3406 in 654 households. Males constitute 53.7% of the population and females 46.2%. Paroha has an average literacy rate of 46.3%, lower than the national average of 74%: male literacy is 63.5%, and female literacy is 36.4%. In Paroha, 19.9% of the population is under 6 years of age.

References

Villages in West Champaran district